Samuel Powel (October 28, 1738 – September 29, 1793) was a colonial and post-revolutionary mayor of Philadelphia, Pennsylvania. Since Philadelphia's mayoral office had been abolished early in the revolutionary period, Powel was the last colonial mayor of the city and the first to serve after the United States gained independence from Great Britain.

He was born in Philadelphia, Pennsylvania, and graduated in 1759 from the College of Philadelphia (now the University of Pennsylvania). He served as mayor from 1775 to 1776 and 1789 to 1790, the office having been abolished under the Pennsylvania Constitution of 1776. He was a member of the Pennsylvania State Senate from 1790 to his death in 1793.

Powel was an early member of the American Philosophical Society and a trustee of the College of Philadelphia (now the University of Pennsylvania).

Personal life

Powel was the son of Samuel Powel and Mary Morris. On August 7, 1769, he married Elizabeth Willing, the daughter of Philadelphia mayor Charles Willing and Ann Shippen, and a sister of Philadelphia mayor and Continental Congressman Thomas Willing, a business partner of Robert Morris.

Powel died in the yellow fever epidemic of 1793 on September 29, 1793, in the bare little upper room of a tenant farmer on Powel's farm west of the city, now the site of the Powelton Village section of West Philadelphia. He is interred at Christ Church Burial Ground.

Powel House
Samuel Powel's house, at 244 South 3rd Street, is a house museum run by the Philadelphia Society for the Preservation of Landmarks. A Georgian city house built by Charles Stedman in 1765, Powel expanded and embellished it around 1770, with carved woodwork and ornate plaster ceilings.

George and Martha Washington were friends of the Powels, and lived next door from November 1781 to March 1782, following the Battle of Yorktown. At the close of Washington's presidency, Mrs. Powel bought some of the furniture from the President's House in Philadelphia. The house museum owns a set of china that was a gift from Martha Washington.

The rear parlor was removed from the house in 1921, and is now at the Metropolitan Museum of Art. The ballroom was removed from the house in 1925, and is now at the Philadelphia Museum of Art. Both rooms have been replicated at the house museum.

Ancestry

Notes

References

Sources

External links

Samuel Powel biography and links at ushistory.org
Powel House official website
Powel House ballroom at Philadelphia Museum of Art

 The Powel Family Papers, 1681-1938 (and here), including correspondence, financial records and other materials belonging to Samuel Powel, are available for research use at the Historical Society of Pennsylvania.
 The Powell Family

1738 births
1793 deaths
Mayors of Philadelphia
University of Pennsylvania alumni
People of colonial Pennsylvania
Members of the American Philosophical Society
Deaths from yellow fever
Burials at Christ Church, Philadelphia